The New South Wales Minister for the Public Service and Employee Relations, Aboriginal Affairs, and the Arts was a minister in the Government of New South Wales who had responsibility for administering legislation and policy in relation to that state's public service, industrial and labour laws and regulations, Indigenous Australians, heritage and the arts in the state of New South Wales, Australia.

The most recent dedicated Minister for the Public Service and Employee Relations, Aboriginal Affairs, and the Arts, from 3 July 2020 until 21 December 2021, was Don Harwin, who also held the additional portfolio title of Special minister of State,

Up until the abolition of the portfolio, the Minister administered the portfolio through the Premier and Cabinet cluster, in particular through the Department of Premier and Cabinet, a department of the Government of New South Wales, and additional agencies including Aboriginal Affairs NSW and Create NSW.

Ultimately the Minister was responsible to the Parliament of New South Wales.

List of ministers

Former ministerial titles

Public sector

Employee relations

Aboriginal Affairs

Arts

See also

List of New South Wales government agencies

References

Public Service and Employee Relations, Aboriginal Affairs, and the Arts
New South Wales